After Sex is a 2007 American romantic comedy-drama film written and directed by Eric Amadio. The plot revolves around several couples having conversations after having sex. It looks at the complexity of modern-day relationships told through eight separate couples. Through dialogue and compromising situations, the film goes from the beginning of a relationship to the aftermath of one, and examines every stage in between.

The film had its world premiere at the Calgary International Film Festival on September 26, 2007, and was released in the United States on DVD on February 19, 2008, by Anchor Bay Entertainment.

Plot
Christopher and Leslie are a couple in their mid to late 20s who have no-strings-attached sex on a regular basis. After another get-together, they debate and argue over the meaning of their relationship and the nature of sex vs. love, with each of them claiming that the other is the only one developing feelings, before both finally say "I love you" to each other.
Freddy and Jay are a pair of college guys who, after having sex, argue over Jay refusing to admit that he is gay until Freddy tells him about his teenaged years of hiding his homosexuality out of fear of being shunned, and tells Jay that he cannot be honest with others about his sexual orientation before he is honest with himself.
Kristy and Sam are a teenaged couple, both of whom have just had sex for the first time in Kristy's bedroom, and after some small talk, Sam has to hide when Kristy's mother, Janet, shows up for a talk about sex with Kristy.
Nikki and Kat are two college roommates who are in a casual sexual relationship where Nikki allows Kat to perform oral sex on her, but insists that she is not a lesbian and only likes the oral sex because Kat performs it better than a guy. During their visit to the campus library, Kat admits to Nikki that she really is a lesbian, but is comfortable with hiding the fact from her strict parents.
Trudy and Gene are a middle-aged, interracial couple who have sex in a nature park, and during the walk back, talk about how they first met at an orgy during the "sexual revolution" of the 1970s and about their children who seem not to understand their active sexual lifestyle.
Neil and Bob are a closeted 30-something gay couple who have sex in Neil's apartment. Afterwards, Neil drives Bob home to his house, where during the drive, they discuss their roles as gay men in a relationship and who is the "butch" and the "bitch", since they both have different backgrounds and careers. The next day, Neil is revealed as the lead singer in a hair rock band, and Bob is a high school football coach.
David and Jordy are an ex-couple who have met at a cheap motel for sex where David defends his infidelity and womanizing as the person that he is, while Jordy is a troubled woman who cannot seem to let go of her ex, despite her knowledge of his unapologetic cheating.
Marco and Alanna are two strangers who have sex after meeting at a nightclub; afterwards they arrive in Marco's loft, where they learn more about each other, but Marco is soon disturbed about the dull-witted Alanna's admission of being a high-priced escort and of her love for sex with strangers for money.

Cast

References

External links

2007 independent films
2007 LGBT-related films
2007 romantic comedy-drama films
2000s English-language films
2000s sex comedy films
American anthology films
American independent films
American LGBT-related films
American romantic comedy-drama films
American sex comedy films
Films about interracial romance
Films shot in Los Angeles
Gay-related films
Lesbian-related films
LGBT-related romantic comedy-drama films
LGBT-related sex comedy films
2000s American films